Neotemnopteryx is a genus of cockroaches in the family Ectobiidae.

Taxonomy
Neotemnopteryx contains the following species:
 Neotemnopteryx bifurcata
 Neotemnopteryx fulva

References

Cockroach genera